Cheema is a town and a municipal committee in Sangrur district  in the state of Punjab, India.

References

Cities and towns in Sangrur district